Melcher may refer to:

Geography
In the United States:
Melcher-Dallas, Iowa
Melcher Covered Bridge, Indiana

People with the surname
Al Melcher (1884–1944), American racecar driver
Arturo Melcher (Borquez) (1921–2008), Chilean hammer thrower, competitor at the 1952 Summer Olympics
David Melcher (born 1954), American businessman and retired Lieutenant General
Erhard Melcher (born 1940), German engineer
Frederic G. Melcher (1879–1963), American publisher
Holman S. Melcher (1841–1905), American Civil War officer and postbellum mayor of Portland, Maine. 
James Melcher (born 1939), American Olympic fencer and hedge fund manager
John Melcher (1924–2018), American politician
Joseph Melcher (1806–1873), Roman Catholic bishop
Martin Melcher (1915–1968), American film producer
Nancy Melcher (1916–2015), American lingerie designer
Terry Melcher (1942–2004), American musician and record producer
Wilhelm Melcher (1940–2005), German violinist

See also
Dennis Melcher Pottery and House, listed on the National Register of Historic Places
Melchers (disambiguation)